Mongo Wrestling Alliance is an adult animated comedy series which aired on Cartoon Network's late night programming block Adult Swim. Produced by Metalocalypse co-creator Tommy Blacha, the show is set in the world of professional wrestling and features the voices of Pamela Adlon, Tommy Blacha, Will Sasso, Billy West, and Harry Dean Stanton. The series premiered on January 23, 2011, with character designs by Ed Piskor. The series combines flash animation with CGI.

Episodes

References

External links
 
 

2010s American adult animated television series
2010s American animated comedy television series
2011 American television series debuts
2011 American television series endings
Adult Swim original programming
American adult computer-animated television series
American adult animated comedy television series
American adult animated sports television series
American flash adult animated television series
American professional wrestling television series
English-language television shows
Television series by Williams Street